The Mount Bundey Training Area (MBTA) is a 117,300 ha. military training area in Australia, 75km south-east of Humpty Doo, south of the Arnhem Highway,  between the Mary River and Kakadu National Park. Formerly a cattle station, the property was acquired as a Defence Training Area in 1988.

Current usage 
The United States and Singaporean militaries both conduct joint tank exercises with Australian forces in the MBTA. These exercises have included the use of an Urban Operations Training Facility constructed in 2005.

The MBTA has been heavily used by the US Marine Air Ground Task Force since its first deployment in 2012.

In mid-2017 the ADF held Exercise Southern Jackaroo at Mount Bundey with elements of the 1st Brigade – Australian Army, US Marine Rotation Force – Darwin (MRF-D) and the Japanese Ground Self Defence Force (JGSDF).

References

Australian Army bases
Barracks in Australia
Military installations in the Northern Territory